Backtalk is an American Thoroughbred racehorse and sire. He was sired by Smarty Jones, who in 2004 lost his bid for the Triple Crown when he ran second to Birdstone. Backtalk is out of the mare Apasionata Sonata, a daughter of Triple Crown winner Affirmed.  He is a multiple stakes winner having won the Bashford Manor Stakes, the Sanford Stakes and the Sportsman's Paradise Stakes.

References
 Backtalk pedigree and racing stats

2007 racehorse births
Racehorses bred in Kentucky
Racehorses trained in the United States
Thoroughbred family 9-e